Badunkadunk or badonkadonk may refer to:
"Badunkadunk" (Robot Chicken episode)
Buttocks or badonkadonk
"Badunkadunk", a song by Twista from Kamikaze
The Badonkadonk, a sandwich featured in Man v. Food (season 8), episode 19

See also
"Honky Tonk Badonkadonk", a 2005 song by Trace Adkins from Songs About Me
"Work It" (Missy Elliott song)